Thota Narasimham is an Indian politician and a member of parliament from Kakinada, Andhra Pradesh. He won the 2014 Indian general election being a Telugu Desam Party candidate. Thota Narasimham won the elections from Kakinada Lok Sabha seat defeating his young rival Chalamalasetty Sunil of the YSRC.

Personal life 
Thota Narasimham was born on 6 July 1962, to Shri Thota Varahalayya and Smt. Thota Padmakshamma. He married Smt. Thota Vani on 25 November 1986 and they have one daughter and a son.

Political career 
Thota Narasimham was a member, Andhra Pradesh Legislative Assembly for two terms i.e. 2004 - 2009 and 2009 - 2014. Between 2010 - 2014 he was the Cabinet Minister, Govt. of Andhra Pradesh. He was elected to 16th Lok Sabha. At the Lok Sabha he is a member of the Business Advisory Committee; Standing Committee on Railways;  General Purposes Committee; Consultative Committee, Ministry of Petroleum and Natural Gas and he is the Leader, Telugu Desam Party in Lok Sabha.

References

Living people
India MPs 2014–2019
Lok Sabha members from Andhra Pradesh
Telugu Desam Party politicians
People from Kakinada
1962 births
Telugu politicians